Song Yinglan (born 14 September 1975) is a retired female Chinese hurdler in the 400 metres.

Her personal best time is 53.96 seconds, achieved in November 2001 in Guangzhou. This is the current Asian record, shared with Han Qing who ran in the same time in September 1993 in Beijing.

International competitions

References

1975 births
Living people
Chinese female hurdlers
Asian Games gold medalists for China
Asian Games medalists in athletics (track and field)
Athletes (track and field) at the 2002 Asian Games
Medalists at the 2002 Asian Games